"Lie to Me" is a song by Canadian singer Tate McRae and Iraqi–Canadian singer and songwriter Ali Gatie. It was released on October 14, 2020 through RCA Records. The song was written by the artists, along with Eirik Gjendemsjø, Emily-Madelen Harbakk, Lise Reppe, Manon van Dijk, Marthe E. Strand, Nicolay Øverland, McRae and Victor Karlsen.

Background
Tate McRae announced the release of her new single with Ali Gatie on her Twitter, "SO UMM @aligatie AND I FINALLY COLLABED!!!! GUYS i hope you enjoy this music video. it was such a great time to film. we filmed it from 7pm-6am! love you guys sooo much! this is 'lie to me':)" In an interview with Billboard, when asked whether she previews her songs on TikTok first, McRae said, "Sometimes I'll record a voice memo with the clip of the song a week before I drop it. When Ali Gatie and I released 'Lie To Me', we did this video that started me with me asking him, 'Do you wanna write a song?' Everyone was super into it."

Personnel
Credits adapted from Tidal.
 Bad One – producer
 Mark Nilan – producer
 Nicolay Øverland – producer, lyricist
 Nova Blue – producer
 kkami – producer
 Ali Gatie – lyricist, associated performer
 Eirik Gjendemsjø – lyricist
 Emily-Madelen Harbakk – lyricist
 Lise Reppe – lyricist
 Manon van Dijk – lyricist
 Marthe E. Strand – lyricist
 Tate McRae – lyricist, associated performer
 Victor Karlsen – lyricist
 Dave Kutch – mastering engineer
 John Rausch – mixing engineer

Charts

Certifications

Release history

References

2020 songs
2020 singles
Ali Gatie songs
Songs written by Tate McRae
Tate McRae songs